Güzide Alçu (born July 5, 1997) is a Turkish women's footballer currently playing in the Turkish Women's First Football League for Amed S.K. She was part of the Turkey women's U-19 team.

Personal life
Güzide Alçu was born in Diyarbakır, southeastern Turkey on July 5, 1997. After completing her secondary education at Diyarbakır Sport High School in the 2014–15 academic term, she was enrolled in the Physical Education and Sports College at Dicle University for the study of Physical Education and Sports Teaching.

Sports career

Club

Alçu played football with boys in the youth team of a Diyarbakır club. She obtained her license on April 7, 2011, from her hometown club Diyarbakır B.B. Spor, which had recently formed their women's football team, and was later renamed to Amed S.K. She played for the first time in the 2011–12 Women's Second League. At the end of the 2013–14 season, her club was relegated to the Third League. She enjoyed her team's promotion to the Second League at the end of the 2015–16 season, and the next season's unbeaten champion title resulted in her promotion to the First League. Alçu significantly contributes to her team's success by scoring goals. She  serves as the captain of her team.

Discipline for displaying V sign
Alçu and two of her teammates of Diyarbakır B.B. Spor displayed V signs to the observers in the stadium at Erzincan after her team's  win by an extraordinary score of 24–0 against the Samsun-based Gülizar Hasan Yılmaz Güz Vocational High School Spor in the playoff match of the Women's Third League on March 21, 2015. The Turkish Football Federation (TFF) interpreted the action as an insulting sign of ideological expression for Kurdish separatism of the team members from Diyarbakır and referred the case to the Disciplinary Board of the TFF.

Upon reactions and public indignation, the TFF stepped back. It called the club officials in the late hours of March 26, 2015, and informed that the disciplinary inquiry launched against the four women footballers was lifted.

International
In 2013, Alçu was called up to the camp of the Turkey girls' U-17 team to get prepared for the 2014 UEFA Women's Under-17 Championship qualification – Group 4 matches. However, she was not selected.

She was admitted to the Turkey women's U-19 team and played only in a friendly match against Azerbaijan on February 24, 2014.

Career statistics
.

References

External links

Living people
1997 births
People from Diyarbakır
Dicle University alumni
Turkish women's footballers
Amed S.K. (women) players
Women's association footballers not categorized by position
Turkish Women's Football Super League players